Rojasianthe is a genus of Mesoamerican flowering plants in the family Asteraceae.

The only known species is Rojasianthe superba, the white sunflower tree, native to Chiapas and Guatemala.

References

Heliantheae
Flora of Chiapas
Flora of Guatemala
Monotypic Asteraceae genera